Simone Guerra (born 30 August 1989) is an Italian footballer who plays for Serie C club Feralpisalò.

Born in Piacenza, Emilia–Romagna, he played for his hometown between 2006 and 2012.

Club career

Piacenza
Between 2006 and 2008 he played with Piacenza "Primavera" team becoming a cornerstone of the team. In 2008, he played into Torneo di Viareggio where he was awarded with fair-play trophy because he hasn't scored into an empty football goal after a collision between a team-mate and the opposing goalkeeper.

In 2006–07 Serie B and 2007–08 Serie B he made his debut in Italian Cup and he made his league debut in the last round of Serie B season, on 1 June 2008. That match he substituted youth team team-mate Antonio Piccolo at half time.

In 2008–09 Serie B season, he has played regularly, until the end of 2008, with the Piacenza "primavera" team, by early 2009 he has been shortlisted in the first team and he marks 10 appearances.

In 2009–10 Serie B season, he became a regular starter of the team, where it marks his first goal, as supportive striker to support Davide Moscardelli and along with Edgar Çani since January. At the end of the season scored 25 league appearances with 3 goals and 1 presence in the Italian Cup.

In 2010–11 Serie B season, the club re-signed Daniele Cacia as new central forward and a new coach Armando Madonna. Madonna preferred Mattia Graffiedi, and Tomás Guzmán as supportive strikers, made him became the 4th forward, ahead Piccolo and Alessandro Tulli. 12 March marks his first goal of the season. At the end of the season scored 2 goals and 29 appearances. Piacenza ends with the nineteenth place and play the play out against Albinoleffe. He played the second game ended 2–2 and then deciding the relegation in Lega Pro First Division.

In 2011–12 Lega Pro Prima Divisione in the preliminary of Italian Cup in the first game scored 3 goals and in the first match of Lega Pro scored the first goal of the match. He remains in the team until January and scored 9 goals in 20 league and cup appearances in total.

Spezia
Simone, 27 January, moved on loan to Spezia Calcio. He made his debut on 29 January in the match 1–1 draw against Siracusa, he scored his first goal in Coppa Italia Lega Pro at 90th minute the winning goal against the Carpi. On 3 May 100 ° in his playing career as a professional, thanks to his double, the Spezia won for the second time in its history the Pro League Cup Italy won 2–1 in the derby against Pisa Pisa, overturning the 1–0 home defeat in the first leg.

Virtus Entella
At the end of the season is released due to the failure of Piacenza and the non-redemption by the Spezia, and so he trains for a short time with Atletico BP Pro Piacenza.
On 29 August, signed for Virtus Entella team of eastern Liguria newly promoted to the First Division. Found here Ighli Vannucchi, Alberto Bianchi and Francesco Conti, already his comrades in La Spezia. He made his debut with his new team on 1 September following the successful challenge to 3–2 at the Tritium game in which scores a goal. Mark a brace the following week against the 4-1 internal Treviso.

Benevento
On 31 January 2014 purchased outright from Benevento, always in the Lega Pro Prima Divisione. Makes his debut won 2 March in the game lost 2–1 against Salernitana. It marks his first goal on 16 March signing the momentary 2–1 in the match drawn 2–2 at the Pisa.

Loans to Matera and Venezia
The following summer it was loaned to Matera, which debuted on 8 August in the game Coppa Italia Lega Pro won for 3- 1 against Vigor Lamezia. It collects 13 appearances.
On 9 January 2015 always he moved on loan to Venezia. He made his debut on 17 January following the 2–0 victory against Pordenone. Marks its first goal on 28 February with a brace in the 2–1 win over Monza. At the end of the season scores 5 goals in 18 appearances.

Feralpisalò
On 21 June 2015 is made official his move to Feralpisalò, with whom he signed a one-year contract. He made his debut with Brescia on 2 August in the match valid for the first qualifying round of Coppa Italia won 5–1 against Fano, which scored a hat-trick.

Vicenza
He moved to Vicenza in January 2019.

Return to Feralpisalò
On 13 January 2021 he returned to Feralpisalò.

Career statistics

Club

Honours

Club
Spezia
 Lega Pro Prima Divisione: 2011–12 (Group A)
 Coppa Italia Serie C: 2011–12
 Supercoppa di Serie C: 2012

Vicenza
 Serie C: 2019–20 (Group C)

Individual
 Serie C top-goalscorer: 2017–18

References

External links
 
 Football.it Profile 
 Piacenza Profile 
 Premio Fair-Play Torneo di Viareggio 2008 
 Guerra capitano coraggioso, il Piace dei giovani passa in Coppa Italia 

1989 births
Living people
Sportspeople from Piacenza
Footballers from Emilia-Romagna
Italian footballers
Association football forwards
Serie B players
Serie C players
Piacenza Calcio 1919 players
Spezia Calcio players
Virtus Entella players
Benevento Calcio players
Matera Calcio players
Venezia F.C. players
FeralpiSalò players
L.R. Vicenza players